Activity may refer to:

 Action (philosophy), in general
 Human activity: human behavior, in sociology behavior may refer to all basic human actions, economics may study human economic activities and along with cybernetics and psychology may study their modulation
 Recreation, or activities of leisure
 The Aristotelian concept of energeia, Latinized as actus
 Activity (UML), a major task in Unified Modeling Language
 Activity, the rate of catalytic activity, such as enzyme activity (enzyme assay), in physical chemistry and enzymology
 Thermodynamic activity, the effective concentration of a solute for the purposes of  mass action
 Activity (project management)
 Activity, the number of radioactive decays per second
 Activity (software engineering)
 Activity (soil mechanics)
 , an aircraft carrier of the Royal Navy
 "Activity", a song by Way Out West from Intensify
Cultural activities, activities referred to culture.

See also
 Activity theory, a learning theory in education
 Social activity (disambiguation), several concepts in the social sciences
 Activiti (software), an open source Business Process Management platform
 Active (disambiguation)